Stegocephali (often spelled Stegocephalia) is a group containing all four-limbed vertebrates. It is equivalent to a broad definition of Tetrapoda: under this broad definition, the term "tetrapod" applies to any animal descended from the first vertebrate with limbs and toes, rather than fins. This includes both the modern lineage of limbed vertebrates (the crown group, including modern amphibians, mammals, reptiles and birds) as well as a portion of the stem group, limbed vertebrates that evolved prior to the origin of the crown group. Members of the tetrapod stem group include the earliest limbed tetrapodomorphs such as Ichthyostega and Acanthostega, which evolved in the Devonian Period long before any modern form of tetrapod.

Many paleontologists prefer a stricter definition of Tetrapoda which applies solely to the crown group, excluding earlier types of limbed tetrapodomorphs. Stegocephali was re-established to replace the broad definition of Tetrapoda, resolving the usage of two conflicting definitions in discussions of tetrapod evolution.

Stegocephali (from Greek  'roofed head') was coined in 1868 by the American paleontologist Edward Drinker Cope, who used it as a general category of prehistoric amphibians. This name was in reference to the skull form of many early tetrapods, with a low, solid shape combining numerous strongly-textured dermal bones. In its original usage, the term quickly became obsolete. In 1998, Canadian paleontologist Michel Laurin repopularized the term and provided a formal phylogenetic definition as a monophyletic clade containing both crown-group and stem-group tetrapods. Laurin's Stegocephali is roughly defined as including all vertebrates closer to modern tetrapods than to Panderichthys. This definition was intended to include taxa with digits rather than fins, except where secondarily lost. Another definition, published in Phylonyms, defines the group as including all taxa closer to Eryops than to Tiktaalik, Panderichthys, or Eusthenopteron. The discovery of the Zachelmie trackways in 2010 suggests that stegocephalians possibly emerged 395 Ma or earlier.

History of classification

Originally, the term was used as a systematic unit at the rank of order. The term rose to prominence in American and British science in the 19th century, though the largely equivalent term Labyrinthodontia had been coined 18 years earlier by Hermann Burmeister in reference to the tooth structure. The terms were used interchangeably during the early 20th century, usually divided into three orders. Cope originally spelled the term as "Stegocephali", though A.S. Woodward introduced a popular alternative spelling, "Stegocephalia", in 1898. In their original usage, Stegocephali (and the Labyrinthodontia) are paraphyletic, the name is now used in an informal way to denote the early non-piscine vertebrates, excluding amniotes (the first reptiles and their descendants) and modern lissamphibians.

Paleontologist Michel Laurin took up the older term and defined stegocephalians phylogenetically as all vertebrates more closely related to Temnospondyli than to Panderichthys (the closest relative of tetrapods known to have retained paired fins, see below). Therefore, Stegocephali includes all vertebrate groups that have toes rather than fins, and a few (Elginerpeton, Metaxygnathus, Ventastega and possibly Hynerpeton) that may have retained paired fins. Contrary to the old usage of this term, the Stegocephali refers to a clade in this scheme. This concept of the clade Stegocephali was chosen to substitute for the name Tetrapoda by those who sought to restrict Tetrapoda to the crown group. As such, it encompasses all presently living land vertebrates as well as their early amphibious ancestors.

Phylogeny
Below is an evolutionary tree of stegocephalians, as recovered from an analysis by Swartz in 2012.

As recovered by Clack et al. 2016:

Subgroups
Elginerpetontidae
Aistopoda
Whatcheeriidae
Colosteidae
Adelospondyli
Baphetoidea
crown-Tetrapoda
Stegocephali incertae sedis
 Acanthostega
 Antlerpeton
 Aytonerpeton
 Brittagnathus
 Crassigyrinus
 Diploradus
 Densignathus
 Doragnathus
 Elpistostege?
 Hynerpeton
 Ichthyerpeton
 Ichthyostega
 Jakubsonia
 Koilops
 Livoniana?
 Mesanerpeton
 Metaxygnathus
 Occidens
 Ossirarus
 Parmastega
 Perittodus
 Sigournea
 Sinostega
 Tantallognathus
 Tiktaalik?
 Tulerpeton
 Tutusius
 Umzantsia
 Ventastega
 Ymeria

References

External links
 Tree of Life: Terrestrial Vertebrates

 
Extant Late Devonian first appearances

no:Panserpadder